Clifton Calvin "Cliff" Seagroves (born January 29, 1976) is an American diplomat serving as the acting director of the Office of Foreign Missions within the United States Department of State. Appointed on August 6, 2020, Seagroves succeeded Stephen Akard.

Education 
Seagroves earned a Bachelor of Arts degree in communication from East Carolina University and a Master of Public Administration from North Carolina Central University.

Career 
From 1999 to 2002, he worked as a revenue officer in the North Carolina Department of Revenue. He then joined the United States Foreign Service, assigned to the U.S. Embassy in Budapest as an intern. In 2002, Seagroves joined the Office of Foreign Missions, where he specialized in diplomatic and consular missions in the United States. Seagroves later served as the principal deputy director of the office until August 6, 2020. Seagroves was then appointed to serve as acting director after the resignation of Stephen Akard.

References 

Living people
American diplomats
East Carolina University alumni
North Carolina State University alumni
United States Department of State officials
Trump administration personnel
United States Foreign Service personnel
1976 births